Keller Site may refer to:

Keller Site (Calion, Arkansas), listed on the National Register of Historic Places in Calhoun County, Arkansas
Keller Site (St. Stephen, South Carolina), listed on the National Register of Historic Places in Berkeley County, South Carolina

See also
Keller House (disambiguation)